The Church of Scientology is a group of interconnected corporate entities and other organizations devoted to the practice, administration and dissemination of Scientology, which is variously defined as a cult, a business, or a new religious movement. The movement has been the subject of a number of controversies, and the Church of Scientology has been described by government inquiries, international parliamentary bodies, scholars, law lords, and numerous superior court judgements as both a dangerous cult and a manipulative profit-making business. In 1979, several executives of the organization were convicted and imprisoned for multiple offenses by a U.S. Federal Court. The Church of Scientology itself was convicted of fraud by a French court in 2009, a decision upheld by the supreme Court of Cassation in 2013. The German government classifies Scientology as an anti-constitutional sect. In France, it has been classified as a dangerous cult. In some countries, it has managed to attain legal recognition as a religion.

The Church of Scientology International (CSI) is officially the Church of Scientology's parent organization, and is responsible for guiding local Scientology centers. Its international headquarters are located at the Gold Base, in an unincorporated area of Riverside County, California near San Jacinto. Scientology Missions International is under CSI and oversees Scientology missions. The Church of Spiritual Technology (CST) is the organization which owns all the copyrights of the estate of L. Ron Hubbard.

All Scientology management organizations are controlled exclusively by members of the Sea Org, which is a legally nonexistent paramilitary organization for the "elite, innermost dedicated core of Scientologists". David Miscavige is described by the Scientology organisation as the highest-ranking Sea Org officer, and is referred to by the organisation as its captain.

History 

The first Church of Scientology organization was incorporated in December 1953 in Camden, New Jersey by L. Ron Hubbard, his wife Mary Sue Hubbard, and John Galusha. By that time, the Hubbard Association of Scientologists International (HASI) had already been operating since 1952 and Hubbard himself had already been selling Scientology books and technologies. In 1953, he wrote to Helen O'Brien, who was managing the organization, asking her to investigate the "religion angle".p. 213 Soon after, despite O'Brien's misgivings and resignation, he announced the religious nature of Scientology in a bulletin to all Scientologists, stressing its relation to the concept of Dharma. The first Church of Scientology opened in 1954 in Los Angeles.

Hubbard stated, "A civilization without insanity, without criminals and without war, where the able can prosper and honest beings can have rights, and where man is free to rise to greater heights, are the aims of Scientology." After the formation of the Church of Scientology, Hubbard composed what he called its "creed". The Scientology "creed" emphasizes three key points: being free to enjoy "religious expression", the idea that mental healing is inherently religious, and that healing of the physical body is in the spiritual domain.

Hubbard had official control of the organization until 1966 when this function was transferred to a group of executives. Although Hubbard maintained no formal relationship with Scientology's management, he remained firmly in control of the organization and its affiliated organizations.

In May 1986, subsequent to the sudden death of L. Ron Hubbard, David Miscavige, who was at that time the Commanding Officer of the Commodore's Messenger Organisation, assumed the position of "chairman of the board" of the Religious Technology Center (RTC), a non-profit corporation that administers the trademarked names and symbols of Dianetics and Scientology. Although RTC is a separate corporation from the Church of Scientology International, whose president and chief spokesperson is Heber Jentzsch, Miscavige is recognized as — and describes himself as — the leader of the Scientology organization.

In 1996, the Church of Scientology implemented the "Golden Age of Tech" (tech pertaining to the entire body of Scientology religious techniques) releasing a training program for Scientology auditors, while precisely following Hubbard's teachings. It was followed by the launch of "The Golden Age of Knowledge" in 2005, where Hubbard's announcements of milestones in the research and development of Dianetics and Scientology were released. Between 2005 and 2010, the organization would complete its 25-year program to restore and verify the Scientology "scriptures". The organization released the second phase of the Golden Age of Tech in November 2013, based on the original work of Hubbard. The Super Power Rundown, a new component of auditing, was released in Clearwater, Florida.

Beliefs 

The Church of Scientology promotes and teaches Scientology, a body of beliefs and related practices created by L. Ron Hubbard, starting in 1952 as a successor to his earlier self-help system, Dianetics.

Scientology teaches that people are immortal spiritual beings who have forgotten their true nature. Scientology's central mythology developed around the original notion of the thetan. In Scientology, the thetan is the individual expression of "theta", described by Neusner as "the cosmic source and life force". The thetan is the true human identity, rendering humans as "pure spirit and godlike". The religion's mythology holds the belief that "in the primordial past, thetans applied their creative abilities to form the physical universe". Contrary to the biblical narrative where the universe was created by a divine, sole creator, Scientology holds that "the universe was created by theta in the form of individualized expressions".

The story of Xenu is part of Scientologist teachings about extraterrestrial civilizations and alien interventions in Earthly events, collectively described as space opera by Hubbard. Xenu was the extraterrestrial ruler of the "Galactic Confederacy" who brought billions of his people to Earth (then known as "Teegeeack") in DC-8-like spacecraft 75 million years ago, stacked them around volcanoes, and killed them with hydrogen bombs. Official Scientology scriptures hold that the thetans (immortal spirits) of these aliens adhere to humans, causing spiritual harm.

These events are known within Scientology as "Incident II", and the traumatic memories associated with them as "The Wall of Fire" or "R6 implant". The narrative of Xenu is part of Scientologist teachings about extraterrestrial civilizations and alien interventions in earthly events, collectively described as "space opera" by L. Ron Hubbard. Hubbard detailed the story in Operating Thetan level III (OT III) in 1967, warning that the "R6 implant" (past trauma) was "calculated to kill (by pneumonia, etc.) anyone who attempts to solve it".
Its method of spiritual rehabilitation is a type of counseling known as "auditing", in which practitioners aim to consciously re-experience painful or traumatic events in their past, to free themselves of their limiting effects. Study materials and auditing courses are made available to members in return for specified donations. Scientology is legally recognized as a tax-exempt religion in the United States and the Church of Scientology emphasizes this in attempting to prove that it is a bona fide religion.

According to the Encyclopedia of American Religions, Scientology is "concerned with the isolation, description, handling and rehabilitation of the human spirit". One purpose of Scientology, as stated by the Church of Scientology, is to become certain of one's spiritual existence and one's relationship to God, or the "Supreme Being".

One of the major tenets of Scientology is that a human is an immortal alien spiritual being, termed a thetan, that is presently trapped on planet Earth in a physical "meat body". Hubbard described these thetans in the Space Opera cosmogony. The thetan has had innumerable past lives and it is accepted in Scientology that lives preceding the thetan's arrival on Earth lived in extraterrestrial cultures. Descriptions of space opera incidents are seen as true events by Scientologists.

The organization claims that they provide methods by which a person can achieve greater spiritual awareness. Within Scientology, progression from level to level is often called The Bridge to Total Freedom. Scientologists progress from "Preclear", to "Clear", and ultimately "Operating Thetan".

Scientologists are taught that a series of events, or incidents, occurred before life on earth. Scientologists also believe that humans have hidden abilities which can be unlocked.

Hubbard's image and writing are ubiquitous in Church of Scientology locations. The organization's centers built after Hubbard's death include a corporate-style office set aside for Hubbard's reincarnation, with a plaque on the desk bearing his name, and a pad of paper with a pen for him to continue writing novels. A large bust of Hubbard is placed in the chapel for Sunday services, and most sermons reference him and his writing.

Headquarters, bases, and central orgs

The highest authority in the Church of Scientology is the Religious Technology Center (RTC). The RTC claims to only be the "holder of Scientology and Dianetics trademarks", but is in fact the main Scientology executive organization. RTC chairman David Miscavige is widely seen as the effective head of Scientology. CSI provides a visible point of unity and guides the individual Church of Scientology centers, especially in the area of applying Hubbard's teaching and technology in a uniform fashion. At a local level, every Scientology center is a separate corporate entity set up as a licensed franchise and has its own board of directors and executives.

Scientology organizations and missions exist in many communities around the world. Scientologists call their larger centers orgs, short for "organizations". The major Scientology organization of a region is known as a central org. The legal address of the Church of Scientology International is in Los Angeles, California, 6331 Hollywood Blvd, in the Hollywood Guaranty Building.

Saint Hill, West Sussex, England 

Hubbard moved to England shortly after founding Scientology, where he oversaw its worldwide development from an office in London for most of the 1950s. In 1959, he bought Saint Hill Manor, a Georgian manor house near the Sussex town of East Grinstead. During Hubbard's years at Saint Hill, he traveled extensively, providing lectures and training in Australia, South Africa in the United States, and developing materials that would eventually become Scientology's "core systematic theology and praxis". While in Saint Hill, Hubbard worked with a staff of nineteen and urged others to join. On September 14, 1959, he wrote: "Here, on half a hundred acres of lovely grounds in a mansion where we have not yet found all the bedrooms, we are handling the problems of administration and service for the world of Scientology. We are not very many here and as the sun never sets on Scientology we are very busy thetans."

The most important achievement of the Saint Hill period was Hubbard's execution of the Saint Hill Special Briefing Course (SHBC). It was delivered by Hubbard from March 1951 to December 1966 and, within the Church of Scientology, is considered the best training course for budding "auditors" in the organization. Scientology groups called "Saint Hill Organizations" located in Los Angeles, Clearwater (Florida), Copenhagen and Sydney still teach this course.

This became the worldwide headquarters of Scientology through the 1960s and 1970s. Hubbard declared Saint Hill to be the organization by which all other organizations would be measured, and he issued a general order (still followed today) for all organizations around the world to expand and reach "Saint Hill size". The Church of Scientology has announced that the next two levels of Scientology teaching, OT 9 and OT 10, will be released and made available to the organization's members when all the major organizations in the world have reached Saint Hill size.

Flag Land Base, Clearwater, Florida, United States

The "worldwide spiritual headquarters" of the Church of Scientology is known as Flag Land Base, located in Clearwater, Florida. It is operated by the Floridian corporation Church of Scientology Flag Service Organization, Inc.

The organization was founded in 1975 when a Scientology-founded group called "Southern Land Development and Leasing Corp" purchased the Fort Harrison Hotel for $2.3 million. Because the reported tenant was the "United Churches of Florida" the citizens and City Council of Clearwater did not realize that the building's owners were actually the Church of Scientology until after the building's purchase. Clearwater citizens' groups, headed by Mayor Gabriel Cazares, rallied strongly against Scientology establishing a base in the city (repeatedly referring to the organization as a cult), but Flag Base was established nonetheless.

In the years since its foundation, the Flag Land Base has expanded as the Church of Scientology has gradually purchased large amounts of additional property in the downtown and waterfront Clearwater area. Scientology's largest project in Clearwater has been the construction of a high-rise complex called the "Super Power Building", or Flag Building, which "is the centerpiece of a 160-million construction campaign."

The Church of Scientology's CST chairman of the board, David Miscavige, led the opening and dedication of the 377,000-square-foot Flag Building on November 17, 2013. The multi-million cathedral is the new spiritual headquarters of Scientology. The fifth and sixth floor contain the "Super Power Program", which includes specially designed machines that Scientologists believe allow users to develop new abilities and experience enlightenment. The building also includes a dining facility, course rooms, offices and small rooms for "auditing" purposes.

Organizations in Hollywood, California 
Los Angeles, California, has the largest concentration of Scientologists and Scientology-related organizations in the world, with the Church of Scientology's most visible presence being in the Hollywood district of the city. The organization owns a former hospital on Fountain Avenue which houses Scientology's West Coast headquarters, the Pacific Area Command Base – often referred to as "PAC Base" or "Big Blue", after its blue paint job. Adjacent buildings include headquarters of several internal Scientology divisions, including the American Saint Hill Organization, the Advanced Organization of Los Angeles, and the Church of Scientology of Los Angeles. All these organizations are integrated within the corporation Church of Scientology Western United States.

The Church of Scientology successfully campaigned to have the city of Los Angeles rename one block of a street running through this complex "L. Ron Hubbard Way". The street has been paved in brick.

Scientology's Celebrity Center International is located on Franklin Avenue, while the Association for Better Living and Education, Author Services and the official headquarters of the Church of Scientology International (in the Hollywood Guaranty Building) are all located on Hollywood Boulevard. The ground floor of the Guaranty Building also features the L. Ron Hubbard Life Exhibition, a museum detailing his life that is open to the general public. The Celebrity Centre was acquired by the organization as the Chateau Elysee in 1973, built to accommodate members in the arts, sports and government.

Another museum in the area is the Psychiatry: An Industry of Death, located on Sunset Boulevard, which is operated by the Church of Scientology-affiliated organization Citizens Commission on Human Rights.

Gold Base, Riverside County, California 

The headquarters of the Religious Technology Center, the entity that oversees Scientology operations worldwide, is located in unincorporated Riverside County, California, near the city of San Jacinto. The facility, known as Gold Base or "Int", is owned by Golden Era Productions and is the home of Scientology's media production studio, Golden Era Studios. Several Scientology executives, including David Miscavige, live and work at the base. Therefore, Gold Base is Scientology's international administrative headquarters.

The Church of Scientology bought the former Gilman Hot Springs resort, which had been popular with Hollywood figures, in 1978; the resort became Gold Base. The facilities at Gold Base have been toured by journalists several times. They are surrounded by floodlights and video observation cameras, and the compound is protected by razor wire.
Gold Base also has recreational facilities, including basketball, volleyball, and soccer facilities, an exercise building, a water slide, a small lake with two beaches, and a golf course.

Trementina Base 

The Church of Scientology maintains a large base on the outskirts of Trementina, New Mexico, for the purpose of storing their archiving project: engraving Hubbard's writings on stainless steel tablets and encasing them in titanium capsules underground. An aerial photograph showing the base's enormous Church of Spiritual Technology symbols on the ground caused media interest and a local TV station broke the story in November 2005. According to a report in The Washington Post, the organization unsuccessfully attempted to coerce the station not to air the story.

Freewinds 

The cruise ship Freewinds was the only location that the highest level of Scientology training (OT VIII) was offered. It cruised the Caribbean Sea, under the auspices of the Flag Ship Service Organization. The Freewinds was also used for other courses and auditing for those willing to spend extra money to get services on the ship. In April 2008, the Freewinds was sealed, and work stopped on refurbishments, due to "extensive contamination" with blue asbestos.

Ideal Orgs 

Starting in 2003 Miscavige began pressuring local Churches of Scientology to purchase larger facilities to use as Scientology centers which would be renovated to become "Ideal Orgs". The theory was "If you build it they will come." This push has included the acquisition of many historic buildings, a plan which professor of religious studies Hugh Urban believes has been pursued to imbue the Church with historical significance and distract from its controversies. For renovations of these buildings, the Church of Scientology has relied heavily on manual labor from Sea Org members in the organization's Rehabilitation Project Force. 

As of 2018, the Church of Scientology claims it had purchased 70 buildings and opened 60 Ideal Orgs around the globe.

With its membership numbers dwindling, Scientology’s ideal org campaign has been called "a real estate scam", a "money-making scam", and "Scientology's principle cash cow". Scientologists were heavily pressured during lengthy fundraising sessions to donate all their money and even open new credit lines to help fund the several million dollar building purchases. This resulted in less money to spend on normal services like training and auditing, so the new orgs became desolate. Staff pay, which is dependent upon weekly org income, was often reduced to a few dollars a week. A 2010 survey of former Scientologists by former Church of Scientology executive Mike Rinder found that the most cited reason for leaving the Church was the unrelenting pressure to donate to programs such as the Ideal Org program.

Some of the buildings purchased for Ideal Orgs remained vacant and unrenovated for years. For example, in the UK, delayed Ideal Orgs included Birmingham (purchased in 2007 and finally opened in 2017), Gateshead (purchased 2007), Manchester (purchased 2006), and Plymouth (purchased 2009). The delays prompted calls from locals for a compulsory purchase of the historically significant buildings, which had remained largely vacant and undeveloped since their purchase.

Publishing and production

Golden Era Productions 

Golden Era Productions is a 500+ acre property in California also known as Gold Base, occupied by the Church of Scientology since 1979. It is where they make Scientology films, reproduce audio recordings of Hubbard's lectures, and assemble E-Meters.

Scientology Media Productions and Scientology Network

In 2011, the Church of Scientology purchased KCET-TV's studio facilities. After five years of renovations and upgrades, the 4.5-acre property was reopened in 2016 as "Scientology Media Productions". The facilities included "three soundstages, postproduction tools, control rooms, music studios, mixing rooms, art departments, scene shops, radio booths, screening rooms, a magazine production space, a live-events hub" and 136,000 square feet of space. In 2018, they launched the Scientology Network.

Bridge Publications and New Era Publications 

Bridge Publications, Inc., incorporated 1981 in California, is the USA publisher for Scientology books and magazines. New Era Publications International, Aps is the publisher in Europe. Other publications organizations include Distribution Center Inc. (Maryland 1955), Publications Organization US (California 1971), and Scientology Publications Limited (UK 1991).

The Bridge Publications print and distribution center, located at 5600 E Olympic Blvd, Commerce, California, occupies 185,000 square feet and prints the organization's magazines and other Scientology materials. The center's press has the capacity to print 55,000 pages per hour. The warehousing and shipping department is fully automated, with the capability of handling half a million items per week.

Author Services Inc. and Galaxy Press 

Author Services Inc. (ASI) represents the literary, theatrical and musical works of L. Ron Hubbard. It is wholly owned by Church of Spiritual Technology. Author Services runs the contests Writers of the Future and Illustrators of the Future. Galaxy Press is an imprint of Author Services, spun off from Bridge Publications in 2002. Author Services and Galaxy Press are located in the Hollywood Guaranty Building.

Affiliated organizations 
There are many independently chartered organizations and groups which are staffed by Scientologists, and pay license fees for the use of Scientology technology and trademarks under the control of Scientology management. In some cases, these organizations do not publicize their affiliation with Scientology.

The Church of Scientology denies the legitimacy of any splinter groups and factions outside the official organization, and has tried to prevent independent Scientologists from using officially trademarked Scientology materials. Independent Scientologists, also known collectively as the "Free Zone" are referred to as squirrels within the organization. They are also classified by the Church of Scientology as suppressive persons ("SPs")—opponents or enemies of Scientology. Hubbard himself stated in Ron's Journal '67 "That there were only seven or eight Suppressive Persons on the planet".

In 2010, an exception to the rule was made specifically for the Nation of Islam, which is the only officially sanctioned external Dianetics organization and the first official non-Scientology Dianetics org since 1953. Minister Louis Farrakhan publicly announced his embracement of Dianetics, and has been actively promoting Dianetics, while stating he has not become a Scientologist. He has courted a relationship with the Church of Scientology, and materials and certifications are still required to be purchased from the organization, and are not independently produced.

Scientology Missions International 

The Scientology Missions International, the branch of the Church of Scientology devoted to Missions, was set up in 1981. According to the organization's official website, the SMI is the "mother church" for all missions, with headquarters in Los Angeles. In 1983, there were forty missions. As of 2009, according to the organization it had grown to an estimated 3,200 centers.

Sea Org 

The Sea Organization (often simply referred to as the "Sea Org") was incorporated under the name Operational Transport Committee in the United Kingdom in 1966 for legal maritime registration purposes. The Sea Org is an unincorporated fraternal religious order founded in 1967 by Hubbard as he embarked on a series of voyages around the Mediterranean Sea in a small fleet of ships staffed by Scientologists and hired professional seamen. Hubbard—formerly a lieutenant junior grade in the US Navy—bestowed the rank of "commodore" of the vessels upon himself. The crew who accompanied him on these voyages became the foundation of the Sea Organization. The very first members of 'The Sea Project' (1966–67) were high-level trained staff and OTIII completions personally chosen by L. Ron Hubbard from Saint Hill Manor and overseas Scientology centers. The purpose was to establish an effective base of operations for the OTC research voyages to assist LRH to verify his discoveries and research into past-lives. Hubbard was also keen to see if he could recover any deposits of treasure that he believed that he had hidden in dozens of locations around the Mediterranean region. Teams of divers and metal-detectorists were dispatched to remote locations to dig for these alleged deposits. There is evidence of some success in locating identified targets, but only two probable eye-witness testimonies of any artifacts being recovered. One from under a temple complex on Sicily and another from an underwater temple at Carthage. Witnesses have claimed to have seen small craft unloading gold bullion onto the 'Athena' vessel and later seen in Hubbard's personal hold aboard the Apollo flagship in 1968 by staff members. (Sources: Mission Into Time and Source magazine. (Issue 9).

The Sea Org is described by the Scientology organization as forming an elite group of the most dedicated Scientologists, who are entrusted with the international management of the organization and "upper level" parts such as the Advanced Organization Los Angeles, American Saint Hill Organization, Flag Service Organization and Celebrity Center International. Sea Org members are also in charge of the upper levels of Operating Thetan (OT) training. The organization is known as the "monastic wing of Scientology".

Scientologists who are qualified to do so are often encouraged to join the Sea Org, which involves a lifetime commitment to Scientology organizations in exchange for room and board, training and auditing, and a small weekly allowance. Members sign an agreement pledging their loyalty and allegiance to Scientology for "the next billion years", committing their future lifetimes to the Sea Org. The Sea Org's motto is "Revenimus" (or "We Come Back").

Critics of Scientology have spoken out against the disciplinary procedures and policies of the Sea Org, which have been a source of controversy since its inception and variously described as abusive and illegal. Former Sea Org members have stated that punishments in the late 1960s and early 1970s included confinement in hazardous conditions such as the ship's chain locker.

In 1974, Hubbard established the Rehabilitation Project Force (or RPF), a forced labour and re-education program against reputedly delinquent members of the Sea Org, which involves long days of hard labor, restricted food, and substandard living conditions. Ex-members who were subjected to RPF have reported physical abuse and that members are prevented from leaving with threats and coercion. It has included teenagers and children as young as twelve years old, and there are reports of child labor for considerably longer than eight hours a day and physical and sexual abuse of minors. In one case, Jenna Miscavige Hill, niece of David Miscavige and author of Beyond Belief: My Secret Life Inside Scientology and My Harrowing Escape, has stated that as a child she often worked 14 hours a day and only got to see her parents once a week, and sometimes more seldom.

Volunteer Ministers 

The Church of Scientology began its "Volunteer Ministers" program as a way to participate in community outreach projects. Volunteer Ministers travel to the scenes of major disasters to provide assistance with relief efforts. According to critics, these relief efforts consist of passing out copies of a pamphlet authored by Hubbard entitled The Way to Happiness, and engaging in a method said to calm panicked or injured individuals known in Scientology as a "touch assist". Accounts of the Volunteer Ministers' effectiveness have been mixed, and touch assists are not supported by scientific evidence.

Religious Technology Center (RTC) 

Around 1982 all of the Hubbard's intellectual property was transferred to a newly formed entity called the Church of Spiritual Technology (CST) and then licensed to the Religious Technology Center (RTC) which, according to its own publicity, exists to safeguard and control the use of the Church of Scientology's copyrights and trademarks.

The RTC employs lawyers and has pursued individuals and groups who have legally attacked Scientology or who are deemed to be a legal threat to Scientology. This has included breakaway Scientologists who practice Scientology outside the central organization and critics, as well as numerous government and media organizations. This has helped to maintain Scientology's reputation for litigiousness (see Scientology and the legal system).

ABLE 

Founded in 1989, the Association for Better Living and Education (ABLE) is an umbrella organization that administers six of Scientology's social programs:
 Applied Scholastics, educational programs based on Hubbard's "Study Tech".
 Criminon prisoner rehabilitation programs.
 International Foundation for Human Rights and Tolerance, which has a particular interest in religious freedom.
 Narconon drug rehabilitation centers.
 The Way to Happiness Foundation, dedicated to disseminating Hubbard's non-religious moral code.
 Youth for Human Rights International, the youth branch of the above.

CCHR 

The Citizens' Commission on Human Rights (CCHR), co-founded with Thomas Szasz in 1969, is an activist group whose stated mission is to "eradicate abuses committed under the guise of mental health and enact patient and consumer protections." It has been described by critics as a Scientology front group.

WISE 

Many other Scientologist-run businesses and organizations belong to the umbrella organization World Institute of Scientology Enterprises (WISE), which licenses the use of Hubbard's management doctrines, and circulates directories of WISE-affiliated businesses. WISE requires those who wish to become Hubbard management consults to complete training in Hubbard's administrative systems; this training can be undertaken at any Church of Scientology, or at one of the campuses of the Hubbard College of Administration, which offers an Associate of Applied Science Degree.
 One of the best-known WISE-affiliated businesses is Sterling Management Systems, which offers Hubbard's management "technology" to professionals such as dentists and chiropractors.
 Another well-known WISE-affiliated business is e.Republic, a publishing company based in Folsom, California. e.Republic publications include Government Technology and Converge magazines. The Center for Digital Government is a division of e. Republic that was founded in 1999.
 Internet ISP EarthLink was founded by Scientologists Sky Dayton and Reed Slatkin as a Scientology enterprise. The company now distances itself from the views of its founder, who moved on to become CEO of Helio (wireless carrier), formerly known as SK-EarthLink.

Celebrities 

In order to facilitate the continued expansion of Scientology, the organization has made efforts to win allies in the form of powerful or respected people. Scientology has had a written program governing celebrity recruitment since at least 1955, when L. Ron Hubbard created "Project Celebrity", offering rewards to Scientologists who recruited targeted celebrities. The organization operates Celebrity Centres for the use of artists, politicians, leaders of industry, sports figures, and other prominent individuals.

Controversy 

Though it has attained some credibility as a religion in many countries, Scientology has also been described as both a cult and a commercial enterprise. Some of the organization's actions also brought scrutiny from the press and law enforcement. For example, it has been noted to engage in harassment and abuse of civil courts to silence its critics, by identifying as Fair Game people it perceives as its enemies.

In 1979, several Scientology members were convicted for their involvement in the organization's Operation Snow White, the largest theft of government documents in U.S. history. Scientologists were also convicted of fraud, manslaughter and tampering with witnesses in French cases, malicious libel against lawyer Casey Hill and espionage in Canada.

In his book World Religions in America, religious scholar Jacob Neusner states that Scientology's "high level of visibility" may be perceived as "threatening to established social institutions".

The film Going Clear, based on the book by the same name, also documents controversies surrounding the organization and its treatment of former members.

Classification 
From 1952 until 1966, Scientology was administered by an organization called the Hubbard Association of Scientologists (HAS), established in Arizona on September 10, 1952. In 1954, the HAS became the HASI (HAS International). The Church of Scientology was incorporated in California on February 18, 1954, changing its name to "The Church of Scientology of California" (CSC) in 1956. In 1966, Hubbard transferred all HASI assets to CSC, thus gathering Scientology under one tax-exempt roof. In 1967, the IRS stripped all US-based Scientology entities of their tax exemption, declaring the organization's activities were commercial and operated for the benefit of Hubbard. Controversy followed the organization in those years, but its growth continued in the 1960s. New facilities were formed in Paris (1959), Denmark (1968), Sweden (1969), and Germany (1970). In the 1970s the religion spread through Europe: in Austria (1971), Holland (1972), Italy (1978), and Switzerland (1978). Centers of Scientology were in 52 countries by the time the 80s came in and grew to 74 by 1992. The organization sued and lost repeatedly for 26 years trying to regain its tax-exempt status. The case was eventually settled in 1993, at which time the organization paid $12.5 million to the IRS—greatly less than IRS had initially demanded—and the IRS recognized the organization as a tax-exempt nonprofit organization. In addition, Scientology also dropped more than fifty lawsuits against the IRS when this settlement was reached. Scientology cites its tax exemption as proof the United States government accepts it as a religion. In January 2009, removal of the tax exemption was rated as number 9 in items for the incoming Barack Obama administration to investigate, as determined in an internet poll run by the presidential transition team soliciting public input for the incoming administration. The U.S. State Department has criticized Western European nations for discrimination against Scientologists in its published annual International Religious Freedom report, based on the International Religious Freedom Act of 1998.

In some countries Scientology is treated legally as a commercial enterprise, and not as a religion or charitable organization. In early 2003, in Germany, The Church of Scientology was granted a tax-exemption for the 10% license fees sent to the US. This exemption, however, is related to a German-American double-taxation agreement, and is unrelated to tax-exemption in the context of charities law. In several countries, public proselytizing undergoes the same restrictions as commercial advertising, which is interpreted as persecution by Scientology.

Unlike many well-established religious organizations, Scientology maintains strict control over its names, symbols, religious works and other writings. The word Scientology (and many related terms, including L. Ron Hubbard) is a registered trademark. Religious Technology Center, the owner of the trademarks and copyrights, takes a hard line on people and groups who attempt to use it in ways unaffiliated with the Church of Scientology (see Scientology and the legal system).

Illegal activities 

L. Ron Hubbard appointed Mary Sue Hubbard to take control of certain aspects of legal protection for the organization in 1968, and the Office of The Guardian was created with its head office situated at Saint Hill Manor. Under The Guardian's Office (later renamed the Office of Special Affairs or OSA), organization members and contracted staff from Bureau One later organized and committed one of the largest penetrations of United States federal agencies ever perpetrated by an organization not affiliated with a foreign government (that is, one such as the KGB). This operation was named Operation Snow White by Hubbard. In the trial which followed the discovery of these activities the prosecution described their actions as such:

The organization has also in the past made use of aggressive tactics in addressing those it sees as trying to suppress them, known as Suppressive Persons (SPs) first outlined by Hubbard as part of a policy called fair game. It was under this policy that Paulette Cooper was targeted for having authored The Scandal of Scientology, a 1970 exposé book about the organization and its founder. This action was known as Operation Freakout. Using blank paper known to have been handled by Cooper, Scientologists forged bomb threats in her name. When fingerprints on them matched hers, the Justice Department began prosecution, which could have sent Cooper to prison for a lengthy term. The organization's plan was discovered at the same time as its Operation Snow White actions were revealed. All charges against Cooper were dismissed, though she had spent more than $20,000 on legal fees for her defense.

On January 22, 2013, attorneys for the organization, as well as some of its members, reacted toward the CNN News Group for its airing of a story covering the release of a book published by a former member, entitled 'Going Clear', published earlier the same year. CNN News Group then chose to publish the reactionary correspondence, with confidential information redacted, on its web site.

According to a 1990 Los Angeles Times article, in the 1980s the Los Angeles branch largely switched from using the organization's members in harassment campaigns to using private investigators, including former and current Los Angeles police officers. The reason seemed to be that this gave the organization a layer of protection.

The Scientology organization has continued to aggressively target people it deems suppressive. In 1998, regarding its announcement that it had hired a private investigator to look into the background of a Boston Herald writer who had written a series on the organization, Robert W. Thornburg, dean of Marsh Chapel at Boston University, said, "No one I know goes so far as to hire outsiders to harass or try to get intimidating data on critics. Scientology is the only crowd that does that." It has apparently continued as recently as 2010. In 2007, when BBC journalist John Sweeney was making Scientology and Me, an investigative report about the organization, he was subjected to harassment:  Sweeney subsequently made a follow up documentary, The Secrets of Scientology, in 2010 during which he was followed and filmed on multiple occasions and one of his interviewees was followed back to his home.

Members' health and safety 

Some key activities of the Church of Scientology are dangerous, and the deaths of some Scientologists have brought attention to the organization, both due to the circumstances of their demises and their relationship with Scientology being a factor. In 1995, Lisa McPherson was involved in a minor automobile accident while driving on a Clearwater, Florida, street. Following the collision, she exited her vehicle, stripped naked and showed further signs of mental instability, as noted by a nearby ambulance crew that subsequently transported her to a nearby hospital. Hospital staff decided that she had not been injured in the accident, but recommended keeping her overnight for observation. Following intervention by fellow Scientologists, McPherson refused psychiatric observation or admission at the hospital and checked herself out against medical advice after a short evaluation. She was taken to the Fort Harrison Hotel, a Scientology retreat, to receive a treatment sanctioned by the organization called Introspection Rundown. She had previously received the Introspection Rundown in June of that year. She was locked in a room for 17 days, where she died. Her appearance after death was that of someone who had been denied water and food for quite some time, being both underweight and severely dehydrated. Additionally, her skin was covered with over one hundred insect bites, presumably from cockroaches. The state of Florida pursued criminal charges against the Church of Scientology. The organization has repeatedly denied any wrongdoing, and now makes members sign a waiver before Introspection Rundown specifically stating that they (or anyone on their behalf) will not bring any legal action against the organization over injury or death. These charges attracted press coverage and sparked lawsuits. Eight years later, Elli Perkins, another adherent to Scientology's beliefs regarding psychiatry, was stabbed to death by her mentally disturbed son. Though Elli Perkins's son had begun to show symptoms of schizophrenia as early as 2001, the Perkins family chose not to seek psychiatric help for him and opted instead for alternative remedies sanctioned by Scientology. The death of Elli Perkins at the hands of a disturbed family member, one whose disease could have been treated by methods and medications banned by Scientology, again raised questions in the media about the organization's methods.

In addition, the organization has been implicated in kidnapping members who have recently left the organization. In 2007, Martine Boublil was kidnapped and held for several weeks against her will in Sardinia by four Scientologists. She was found on January 22, 2008, clothed only in a shirt. The room she was imprisoned in contained refuse and an insect infested mattress.

On Friday March 28, 2008, Kaja Bordevich Ballo, daughter of Olav Gunnar Ballo, Norwegian parliament member and vice president of the Norwegian Odelsting, took a Church of Scientology personality test while studying in Nice. Her friends and co-inhabitants claim she was in good spirits and showed no signs of a mental breakdown, but the report from the organization said she was "depressed, irresponsible, hyper-critical and lacking in harmony". A few hours later she committed suicide by jumping from her balcony at her dorm room leaving a note telling her family she was sorry for not "being good for anything". The incident has brought forward heavy criticism of the organization from friends, family and prominent Norwegian politicians. Inga Marte Thorkildsen, parliament member, went as far as to say "Everything points to the Scientology cult having played a direct role in making Kaja choose to take her own life".

Missionary activities 

Members of the public entering a Scientology center or mission are offered a "free personality test" called the Oxford Capacity Analysis by Scientology literature. The test, despite its name and the claims of Scientology literature, has no connection to Oxford University or any other research body. Scientific research into three test results came to the conclusion that "we are forced to a position of skepticism about the test's status as a reliable psychometric device" and called its scientific value "negligible".

Further proselytization practices – commonly called "dissemination" of Scientology – include information booths, flyers and advertisement for free seminars and Sunday Services in regular newspapers and magazines, personal contacts and sales of books.

Legal waivers 

Recent legal actions involving Scientology's relationship with its members (see Scientology controversy) have caused the organization to publish extensive legal documents that cover the rights granted to followers. It has become standard practice within the organization for members to sign lengthy legal contracts and waivers before engaging in Scientology services, a practice that contrasts greatly with almost every mainstream religious organization. In 2003, a series of media reports examined the legal contracts required by Scientology, which state, among other things, that followers deny any psychiatric care their doctors may prescribe to them.

Membership statistics 
It is difficult to obtain reliable membership statistics. In the US, the 2008 American Religious Identification Survey found that the there were 25,000 Scientologists in the US. Some of these were not considered to be members of the organization. A 2008 Trinity College survey similarly concluded there were 25,000 Scientologists. The International Association of Scientologists (IAS), the official Church of Scientology membership system since 1984, has never released figures. The organization's spokespersons either give numbers for their countries or a worldwide figure.

The organization has said that it has eight to fifteen million members worldwide, but this figure is known to be an aggrandizing fabrication. Religious scholar J. Gordon Melton has said that the organization's estimates of its membership numbers are exaggerated: "You're talking about anyone who ever bought a Scientology book or took a basic course. Ninety-nine percent of them don't ever darken the door of the church again." Melton has stated that if the claimed figure of 4 million American Scientologists were correct, "they would be like the Lutherans and would show up on a national survey".

Statistics from other sources:
 In 2001, the American Religious Identification Survey (ARIS) reported that there were 55,000 adults in the United States who consider themselves Scientologists. A 2008 survey of American religious affiliations by the US Census Bureau estimated there to be 25,000 Americans identifying as Scientologists.
 The 2001 United Kingdom census contained a voluntary question on religion, to which approximately 48,000,000 chose to respond. Of those living in England and Wales who responded, a total of 1,781 said they were Scientologists.
 In 2011, Statistics Canada, the national census agency, reported a total of 1,745 Scientologists nationwide, up from 1,525 in 2001 and 1,220 in 1991.
 In 2005, the German Office for the Protection of the Constitution estimated a total of 5,000 – 6,000 Scientologists in that country, and mentioned a count of 12,000 according to Scientology Germany.
 In the 2006 New Zealand census, 357 people identified themselves as Scientologists, although a spokesperson for the organization said there were between 5,000 and 6,000 Scientologists in the country. Earlier census figures were 207 in the 1991 census, 219 in 1996, and 282 in 2001.
 In 2006, Australia's national census recorded 2,507 Scientologists nationwide, up from 1,488 in 1996, and 2,032 in 2001. The 2011 census however found a decrease of 13.7 percent from the 2006 census.
 In 2011, SonntagsZeitung reported that support for Scientology in Switzerland had experienced a steady decline from 3,000 registered members in 1990 to 1,000 members and the organization was said to be facing extinction in the country. A Church of Scientology spokeswoman rejected the figures insisting that the organization had 5,000 "passive and active members in Switzerland".
In 2011, the "Scientology Association of Finland" had approximately 120 members.

Finances 

In 2008, the Church of Scientology and its large network of corporations, nonprofits and other legal entities were estimated to bring in around 500 million US dollars in annual revenue.

Scientologists can attend classes, exercises or counseling sessions for a set range of "fixed donations"; however, membership without courses or auditing is possible. According to a sociological report entitled "Scientology: To Be Perfectly Clear", progression between levels above "clear" status cost $15,760.03 in 1980 (this cost does not include additional special treatments). Scientologists can choose to be audited by a fellow Scientologist rather than by a staff member.

Critics say it is improper to fix a donation for religious service; therefore the activity is non-religious. Scientology points out many classes, exercises and counseling may also be traded for "in kind" or performed cooperatively by students for no cost, and members of its most devoted orders can make use of services without any donations bar that of their time. A central tenet of Scientology is its Doctrine of Exchange, which dictates that each time a person receives something, he or she must give something back. By doing so, a Scientologist maintains "inflow" and "outflow", avoiding spiritual decline.

Government opinions of Scientology 

While some governments now give the Church of Scientology protections and tax relief, other sources describe the organization as a pseudoreligion or a cult. Sociologist Stephen Kent published at a Lutheran convention in Germany that he likes to call it a transnational corporation.

Early official reports in countries such as the United Kingdom (1971), South Africa (1972), Australia (1965) and New Zealand (1969) have yielded unfavorable observations and conclusions.

Australia 

There is currently no legal restriction in Australia on the practice of Scientology. In 1983 the High Court of Australia dealt with the question whether the Church of Scientology is a religious institution and as such not subject to payroll tax. The Court unanimously confirmed the organization to be a religious institution with respect exemption from payroll taxes.

On November 18, 2009 the organization came under fire from an Independent senator in the Commonwealth Parliament, Nick Xenophon. Under parliamentary privilege in the Senate, Xenophon declared that the Church of Scientology is a criminal organization.

Belgium 

In September 2007, a Belgian prosecutor announced that they had finished an investigation of Scientology and said they would probably bring charges. The Church of Scientology said the prosecutor's public announcement falsely suggested guilt even before a court could hear any of the charges. In December 2012, Belgian officials completed their file on Scientology and brought charges of extortion, illegal medicine, various breaches of privacy, and fraud.

France 

In France, a parliamentary report classified Scientology as a dangerous cult. On November 22, 1996, the leader of the Lyon Church of Scientology, Jean-Jacques Mazier, was convicted of fraud and involuntary homicide and sentenced to eighteen months in prison for his role in the death of a member who committed suicide after going deeply into debt to pay for Scientology auditing sessions. Fourteen others were convicted of fraud as well. In 2009, members of the organization were sued for fraud and practicing pharmacology without a license, and the organization was convicted of fraud in October 2009, being fined €600,000, with additional fines and suspended prison sentences for four officers.

In an interview on the Canadian Broadcasting Corporation current affairs radio program The Current with Hana Gartner, former high-ranking Scientology official Mark Rathbun commented that the decision to convict the Church of Scientology of fraud in France would not have a significant impact on the organization. "On the France thing I don't think that's going to have any lasting impact, simply because they got a nine hundred thousand dollar fine I think – which is like chump change to them. They've got literally nearly a billion dollars set aside in a war chest", said Rathbun.

Germany 

In Germany, official views of Scientology are particularly skeptical. In Germany it is seen as a totalitarian anti-democratic organization and is under observation by national security organizations due to, among other reasons, suspicion of violating the human rights of its members granted by the German Constitution, including Hubbard's pessimistic views on democracy vis-à-vis psychiatry and other such features. In December 2007, Germany's interior ministers said that they considered the goals of Church of Scientology to be in conflict with the principles of the nation's constitution and would seek to ban the organization. The plans were quickly criticized as ill-advised. The plans to ban Scientology were finally dropped in November 2008, after German officials found insufficient evidence of illegal activity.

The legal status of the Church of Scientology in Germany is still awaiting resolution; some courts have ruled that it is a business, others have affirmed its religious nature. The German government has affirmed that it does not consider the Church of Scientology to be a religious community.

Ireland 
As in most European countries, the Church of Scientology is not officially recognized in Ireland as a charitable organization. The Irish government has not invited the Church of Scientology to national discussions on secularization by the Religious Council of Ireland. The meetings were attended by Roman Catholic bishops, representatives of the Church of Ireland, Ireland's Chief Rabbi, and Muslim leaders.

Israel 

In 1987, an Israeli parliamentary commission declared it a cult, but the practice of Scientology in Israel is legal. In Israel, according to Israeli professor of psychology Benjamin Beit-Hallahmi, "in various organizational forms, Scientology has been active among Israelis for more than thirty years, but those in charge not only never claimed the religion label, but resisted any such suggestion or implication. It has always presented itself as a secular, self-improvement, tax-paying business." Those "organizational forms" include a Scientology Organization in Tel Aviv. Another Israeli Scientology group called "The Way to Happiness" (or "Association for Prosperity and Security in the Middle East") works through local Scientologist members to promote The Way to Happiness. An Israeli CCHR chapter runs campaigns against perceived abuses in psychiatry. Other Scientology campaigns, such as "Youth for Human Rights International" are active as well. There is also an ultra-Orthodox Jewish group that opposes Scientology and other cults or missionary organizations in Israel, Lev L'Achim, whose anti-missionary department in 2001 provided a hotline and other services to warn citizens of Scientology's "many types of front organizations".

Netherlands 
On October 17, 2013, a Dutch court ruled that "the Amsterdam arm of Scientology is a charitable organization and exempt from paying taxes." DutchNews.nl reported that the court ruled "The Scientology Church in Amsterdam be treated in the same way as other church and faith-based organizations and allowed to claim tax breaks". The appeal court also ruled that "Scientology's classes don't differ significantly from what other spiritual organizations do, or can do." The court noted "Scientology movement's training programs are not the same as those offered by commercial companies because people who cannot afford them pay a reduced fee or get them free" and that "the courses are aimed at spiritual and theoretical enlightenment."

Russia 
The European Court of Human Rights ruled in April 2007 that Russia's denial to register the Church of Scientology as a religious community was a violation of Article 11 of the European Convention on Human Rights (freedom of assembly and association) read in the light of Article 9 (freedom of thought, conscience and religion)". In July 2007, the St. Petersburg City Court closed down that city's Scientology center for violating its charter.

Spain 
On October 31, 2007, the National Court in Madrid issued a decision recognizing that the National Church of Scientology of Spain should be entered in the Registry of Religious Entities. The administrative tribunal of Madrid's High Court ruled that a 2005 justice ministry decision to scrap the organization from the register was "against the law". Responding to a petition filed by the organization, the ruling said that no documents had been presented in court to demonstrate it was anything other than a religious entity.

United Kingdom 

The UK government's 1971 official report into Scientology was highly critical, but concluded that it would be unfair to ban the organization outright. The UK government does not classify the Church of Scientology as a religious institution and it is not a registered charity. However, in 2000, the Church of Scientology was exempted from UK value added tax on the basis that it is a not-for-profit body.

In December 2013, the UK Supreme Court officially ruled that Scientology is a religion, in response to a 5-year legal battle by Scientologist Louisa Hodkin to marry at the Church of Scientology chapel in central London. With the new ruling, the Registrar General of Births, Marriages and Deaths now recognize weddings performed within Scientology chapels and redefined religion so that it was "not ... confined to those with belief in a supreme deity."

United States 

In 1979 Hubbard's wife, Mary Sue Hubbard, along with ten other highly placed Scientology executives were convicted in United States federal court regarding Operation Snow White, and served time in an American federal prison. Operation Snow White involved infiltration, wiretapping and theft of documents in government offices, most notably those of the United States Internal Revenue Service (IRS).

In 1993, however, the United States IRS recognized Scientology as a "non-profit charitable organization", and gave it the same legal protections and favorable tax treatment extended to other non-profit charitable organizations. A New York Times article says that Scientologists paid private investigators to obtain compromising material on the IRS commissioner and blackmailed the IRS into submission.

In a 2001 legal case involving a married couple attempting to obtain a charitable deduction for a donation to a Jewish school, Judge Silverman stated:

To date (2008) such a suit is not known to have been filed. In further appeal in 2006, the US Tax Court again rejected the couple's deduction, stating: 

However, this matter is still ongoing. On February 8, 2008, three judges in the US 9th Circuit Court of Appeals "expressed deep skepticism" over the IRS's position that treatment of Scientology is "irrelevant to the deductions the Orthodox Jews, Michael and Marla Sklar, took for part of their children's day school tuition and for after-school classes in Jewish law".

Gallery

See also 
 List of Scientology organizations
 List of groups referred to as cults in government documents

References

Works cited

External links 

 
 
 Satellite Image of the Gold Base

Scientology
Scientology organizations
Scientology
Organizations based in Riverside County, California
1953 establishments in New Jersey
Cults
San Jacinto, California